Lanedo is a professional open source software development consultancy based in Germany.  It operates as a European company with limited liability based in Hamburg. The company has been involved with a number of mobile and embedded platforms over the years including Maemo and MeeGo. Their software development has a focus around Linux in general and targeting platforms ranging from mobile and embedded to desktop environments.

The name 'Lanedo' is based on a roughly phonetic sounding of the letters L, N, and D.  These are mentioned as Linux, Networking, and Development respectively.

History 

In 2003, Mikael Hallendal and Richard Hult were working together on a project management application called Planner. They founded Imendio.

In 2011, Lanedo joined the Document Foundation TSC (Task Steering Committee) and became much more involved in the future of LibreOffice.

Starting in summer 2012, Lanedo, in cooperation with ITOMIG, supported the town of Munich in the LibreOffice maintenance of the LiMux project.
Lanedo is also actively participating in implementing the OOXML support for LibreOffice.

Projects Lanedo is involved in 

These projects are contributed to by Lanedians.

References

External links 
 
 
 
 Lanedo developer's blogs
 Imendio former Planner project

Companies based in Hamburg
Software companies established in 2009
Free software companies
GNOME companies
LibreOffice
Software companies of Germany
German companies established in 2009